King Xi of Zhou (died 677 BC), personal name Jī Húqí, was the sixteenth king of the Chinese Zhou dynasty and the fourth of the Eastern Zhou.

He was a successor of his father King Zhuang of Zhou, and was succeeded by his son, King Hui of Zhou.

By his time China had dissolved into a multitude of states, only nominally subject to the king, who was no longer even the most powerful figure in China (that was Duke Huán of the State of Qí).

Family
Sons:
 Prince Lang (d. 652 BC), ruled as King Hui of Zhou from 676–652 BC
 Prince Hu (d. 624 BC), ruled as Duke Wen of Wangshu until 624 BC

Ancestry

See also
 Family tree of ancient Chinese emperors

Notes 

Zhou dynasty kings
677 BC deaths
7th-century BC Chinese monarchs
Year of birth unknown